

The Cuyuna Iron Range Municipally-Owned Elevated Metal Water Tanks are a group of five water towers within the Cuyuna Range in Crow Wing County, Minnesota.  The water tanks, built between 1912 and 1918, were listed on the National Register of Historic Places because they represent the historical period of community planning, public works, and engineering that supported the development of the Cuyuna Range.  Their construction was made possible by a favorable property tax arrangement on the iron mines that brought significant revenues to the towns of Crosby, Cuyuna, Deerwood, Ironton, and Trommald.  The communities began around 1910, when iron mining started on the Range.  The peak of mining employment was around 1920, and it started to decline around 1930.  By the 1950s, iron mining was well in decline on the Cuyuna Range. As of 2022, it appears only two of the water tanks survive at their original locations.

State historian Theodore C. Blegen wrote, 
A singular aspect of range-town life was the blossoming of schools, community buildings, parks, splendid streets, and other public improvements built generously, not to say lavishly.  They set standards far beyond those of most Minnesota cities at the time.  These reflected at once a public desire for the best, a concern on the part of citizens for the education of their children, and the availability of taxes to provide the funds without stint for public wants. 
Even the smaller communities were able to install complete water systems.  After the end of iron mining, as the communities lost population, many of the publicly funded improvements such as schools have disappeared, and many of the houses have either been torn down or were left abandoned and dilapidated.  Within Trommald and Cuyuna, the water towers are the most visible remains of the mining boom years.

The five water towers are each separately listed on the National Register, as:

It was moved on a windy day south along Curtis Avenue and was photographed mid-move in front of the Spina Hotel Block. When the editorial was written, demolition of the (moved) tower was planned; the city council was voting to appropriate $6,000 for its demolition.

See also
National Register of Historic Places listings in Crow Wing County, Minnesota

Notes

References

External links
Save Ironton's Water Tower
In Deerwood: Water Tower On The Range at Minnesota Prairie Roots

Buildings and structures in Crow Wing County, Minnesota
Water towers on the National Register of Historic Places in Minnesota
Water tanks on the National Register of Historic Places
National Register of Historic Places Multiple Property Submissions
Mining in Minnesota
Towers completed in 1912
Towers completed in 1918
1912 establishments in Minnesota
National Register of Historic Places in Crow Wing County, Minnesota